Amar is a 1954 Indian Hindi-language romantic drama film produced and directed by Mehboob Khan. 
Dealing with the controversial subject matter of rape, the film revolves around the titular upper-class lawyer (Dilip Kumar), his feminist fiancé, the social worker Anju Roy (Madhubala), and Sonia (Nimmi), a poor milkmaid.

Plot
Amarnath (Dilip Kumar), a well-known lawyer, is known for his sense of justice. One day, he meets Soniya (Nimmi), a milkwoman. She is awed by him and he finds her interesting. Amar's father wants him to get married and sends him Anju's (Madhubala) photograph. Anju has graduated from a foreign university and believes in justice and aiding the poor. Both she and Amar take a liking to each other and they are soon engaged. One night, after attending a local fair, Soniya is attacked by the local ruffian Shankar (Jayant) who wants  to possess her at any cost. In a bid to escape him, Soniya runs heedlessly into Amar's house as a thunderstorm begins. In the lonely house, Amar ends up raping Soniya. Amar's conscience torments him as he tries to hide his misdeed and proceed with his engagement to Anju. Anju senses something is amiss, but cannot fathom what it is. Meanwhile, it is revealed that Soniya is pregnant. She refuses to name the father of her child and is cast out by the villagers as a fallen woman. Shankar manages to figure out who the father of Soniya's child is and wants to avenge her. He ends up dying by his own hands. Amar is accused of murdering him and the truth regarding him and Soniya comes out. The villagers eventually want to lynch Soniya. Anju supports and protects her. In the end, she ensures that Amar officially marries Soniya and leaves the village once her duty is done.

Cast
 Madhubala as Anju Roy
 Dilip Kumar as Advocate Amarnath
 Nimmi as Sonia
 Jayant as Sankat
 Ulhas as Rai Saheb Mohanlal
 Mukri as Advocate
 Husn Banu
 Amar		
 Siddiqui		
 Murad as The Judge
 Pande

Production
For the role of Anju Roy, Mehboob Khan had initially cast the actress Meena Kumari. However, due to some reasons, Kumari could not continue shooting and left the film. Following Kumari's departure, the shooting came to a halt and several actresses made unsuccessful tries to achieve the high-profile role. In late 1952, Raj Kapoor phoned Khan requesting him to cast Nargis (whom Kapoor was dating then) in the role. However, at this time, there was a considerable amount of lobbying from Kumar's side also, to take Madhubala in the film. Finally, Khan had to refuse to Kapoor and choose Madhubala on Kumar's insistence.

Soundtrack

The music was composed by Naushad with lyrics by Shakeel Badayuni.

Release

Critical reception
Amar was released on 10 September 1954 to positive reviews. Baburao Patel, the editor of Filmindia, called it "a brilliant picture with a gripping human story superbly directed and acted with flawless perfection. A masterpiece of film craft." Swatantrata magazine was highly impressed by Khan's direction and commented that "Mehboob can really be proud of this achievement." The magazine also defended Kumar's anti-hero role, quoting Jawaharlal Nehru as "films must amuse and at the same time educate." Deepak Mahaan of The Hindu lauded the film for its characterization of strong female protagonists and photography of rape scenes without any nudity. Mahaan added: "The black and white canvas lent the story a quiet dignity, appropriate to the ethical tussle between truth and desire, moral turpitude and justice." In a retrospective review, Khalid Mohammed noted that the protagonists were not portrayed as "snow-white paragons of virtue" but are instead shown with "human weaknesses", which is a rarity in Indian cinema. Also, Amar is stated to be the most favourite film of Khan. In 2019, Rachit Gupta of Filmfare mentioned Madhubala's portrayal of Anju among her finest performances. Actor Naseeruddin Shah called Dilip Kumar's performance in Amar as one of his favourites.

Box office
Trade website Box Office India reported that Amar grossed  at the box office and was a below-average earner at box-office. Mahaan and Karan Bali subsequently attributed the film's controversial subject matter to its poor box office earnings.

Accolades
 Filmfare Best Sound Award for R. Kaushik.

References

Bibliography

External links
 

1954 films
1950s Hindi-language films
Indian romantic drama films
Films directed by Mehboob Khan
Films scored by Naushad
Indian black-and-white films
1950s Urdu-language films
Hindi-language drama films
1954 romantic drama films